Tocopilla Museum is a municipal archaeology museum in the Chilean city of Tocopilla located in the coast of Atacama Desert. Among its collections are chisels and hatchets but despite being in a zone of colonial and Pre-Hispanic metallurgy there are no  metal species from the city or its surroundings in the collection.

References

Museums in Antofagasta Region
Archaeological museums in Chile
Pre-Columbian art museums
Local museums in Chile